Carlo Vittorio Varetti was an early Italian football player at Juventus who played as a defender. When Juventus joined the Italian Football Championship in 1900 Varetti was one of the players involved; he played for the club over the course of eight seasons, being part of the bianconeri's first league title victory in 1905.

After president Alfredo Dick left Juventus to form Torino, Varetti took over as the new president. He served in the role of president from 1907 until 1910.

Honours
Juventus
Italian Football Championship: 1905

References

Italian footballers
Juventus F.C. players
1884 births
1963 deaths
Juventus F.C. chairmen and investors
Association football defenders